Robert Buchan Duthie, CBE, FRCSE, FRCS (4 May 1925 – 25 December 2005) was an American-born British orthopaedic surgeon who established the prestige of the Nuffield Orthopaedic Centre in Oxford and built its leading reputation for musculoskeletal medicine. Duthie was the fourth Nuffield Professor of Orthopaedic Surgery at the University of Oxford, serving between 1966 and 1992.

Duthie developed novel methods of injury management and contributed to teaching and research, turning Oxford into a major centre for training. From 1973 to 1978 he served on the Pearson commission.

Bibliography
 Biography in Plarr's Lives of the Fellows Online
[Anon.] (2008) "Duthie, Prof. Robert Buchan", Who Was Who 1897-2007, A&C Black

References

External links 
 

1925 births
2005 deaths
British orthopaedic surgeons
English surgeons
Fellows of the Royal College of Surgeons
Fellows of the Royal College of Surgeons of Edinburgh
American emigrants to England
Commanders of the Order of the British Empire
Naturalised citizens of the United Kingdom
People educated at King Edward VI Grammar School, Chelmsford
Statutory Professors of the University of Oxford
20th-century surgeons